Bachna Ae Haseeno is a 2008 Indian Hindi-language romantic comedy film directed by Siddharth Anand, whose previous projects included Salaam Namaste (2005) and Ta Ra Rum Pum (2007). Produced by Yash Raj Films, the film stars Ranbir Kapoor, Bipasha Basu, Deepika Padukone and Minissha Lamba in lead roles. The title of the film was taken from the popular song "Bachna Ae Haseeno" from Hum Kisise Kum Naheen (1977), which starred Kapoor's father Rishi Kapoor. 

Bachna Ae Haseeno released on 15 August 2008 on the eve of the 61st Indian Independence Day and grossed ₹61.57 crore worldwide, thus becoming the eighth-highest grossing Hindi film of 2008. It received mixed-to-positive reviews from critics upon release, who praised its soundtrack, cinematography and costumes, along with major praise directed towards Basu's performance. 

At the 54th Filmfare Awards, Bachna Ae Haseeno received 3 nominations – Best Supporting Actress (Basu), Best Male Playback Singer (KK for "Khuda Jaane") and Best Female Playback Singer (Shilpa Rao for "Khuda Jaane").

Plot
Raj Sharma is a young playboy who meets three young women at different stages in his life and learns important lessons about love along the way. As the story opens in 2008, it leads to a series of flashbacks over how he has grown to see through life.

1996, Switzerland – Mahi 

On a trip to Switzerland with his friends, Raj runs into Mahi Pasricha on the Eurail, who is on vacation with her friends and family. Mahi is a sweet, dreamy girl who believes in true love and is hoping to find her 'Raj' (a reference to Dilwale Dulhania Le Jayenge (1995)) i.e. her true love. When she misses her train, Raj helps her reach the airport through a different route. On the way, they share a kiss after Raj reads her a poem he wrote about her. At the airport, when she opens the paper on which Raj had written the poem, she finds it blank. Raj boasts to his friends about what happened between the pair and how he took full advantage of the situation when she was alone. Mahi overhears this and is shocked and heartbroken. Raj realizes that she has overheard his conversation with his friends and shamefacedly leaves.

2002, Mumbai – Radhika 

6 years after the Switzerland episode, Raj has moved to Mumbai and found a job with Microsoft as a game designer with his best friend Sachin Kulkarni. Pretty soon, he enters into a live-in relationship with neighbor Radhika Kapoor, an aspiring model. Having received an offer to move to Sydney for a Halo 3 game launch, he expects to be able to leave Radhika and move on, assuming she is capable of handling a break-up. This vision is shattered when Radhika declares that she intends to sacrifice her career to marry Raj and join him in Australia. He makes up reasons to Radhika so as to prevent them from getting married, but she remains firm. Raj, unable to express his commitment phobia, boards his flight on the morning of his wedding to Radhika. Radhika learns this while waiting for him at the registrar's office dressed as a bride, and is left crestfallen and heartbroken.

2007, Sydney – Gayatri 

5 years down the line, Raj now enjoys a successful career along with Sachin in Sydney. He meets Gayatri Joshi, a feisty and independent woman who studies at business school during the day, and moonlights as a taxi-driver at night. As they date, he gains feelings for her. He also realizes that his feelings for her challenge his misgivings towards commitment. He proposes to her, but Gayatri turns him down, saying that she is happy with her life as she is and she doesn't believe in marriage and commitment.

Rejection cuts Raj deep. He recalls when he broke the hearts of Mahi and Radhika, realizing how they must have felt. He decides to seek them out and ask for forgiveness.

2008 – Present Day 
On his return to India, in Amritsar, in 2008, Raj first seeks out Mahi, who is now married and has two sons. Her husband Joginder "Jogi" Singh Ahluwalia recognizes Raj from the Switzerland episode and knocks him out. He blames Raj for Mahi no longer believing in love or romance because of him, although he explains that she is a perfect wife and has a perfect home and family. Firm in his decision not to leave without being forgiven, he befriends Jogi's friend Karan Bahl, who is set to be married. At Karan's sangeet ceremony, Raj apologizes to Mahi and convinces her that Jogi is her true love, while also reconciling with the Pasrichas in the process. She opens up to Jogi and forgives Raj.

Raj then searches for Radhika and discovers that she has changed her name to Shreya Rathore and has become a successful supermodel. Raj tries to meet Shreya at an event but she ignores him. Shreya then flies to Capri, Italy for a vacation and Raj follows her there. Raj finally meets Shreya but she refuses to accept his apologies and tells him that if he really wants her forgiveness, he will have to work for it. Willing to do this, Raj becomes her personal assistant and she makes him do all sorts of tasks, even serving at parties. She humiliates him on every occasion, but he remains firm, serving without complaint. She finally gives up and tells him how hurt she had felt back then, and asks him to leave. However, before Raj goes home, she arrives and tells him that she realized that the root of her frustration was bottled-up hate against him that she no longer bears. She then forgives him as he leaves.

Content, Raj returns to Australia. On his return, he finds a pile of letters from Gayatri, written over the six months he was gone. Raj meets Gayatri in her taxi. She regrets turning him down. The lovers reconcile and confess their love.

Cast
 Ranbir Kapoor as Raj Sharma
 Bipasha Basu as Radhika Kapoor / Shreya Rathore
 Deepika Padukone as Gayatri Joshi
 Minissha Lamba as Mahi Pasricha / Mahi Ahluwalia
 Kunal Kapoor as Joginder "Jogi" Singh Ahluwalia, Mahi's husband
 Hiten Paintal as Sachin Kulkarni, Raj's best friend
 Sumeet Arora as Manish Ahuja, Raj's friend
 Puneet Issar as Rohit Pasricha, Mahi's father
 Avantika Hundal as Mona Joshi, Mahi's friend
 Sham Mashalkar as Vishal Bhardwaj, Raj's friend
 Ntasha Bhardwaj as Preeti Malhotra, Mahi's best friend
 Pratik Dixit as Karan Bahl, Jogi's friend

Production

In April 2007, sources indicated that director Siddharth Anand had signed for the main lead in his next film. However, after saying the news was "mere speculation" and "absolutely untrue," Anand later confirmed that Kapoor was starring in his film.

Anand was also in talks with the actresses Preity Zinta, Bipasha Basu and Deepika Padukone for the roles in question, but indicated that "it wouldn't be right to reveal their names till we sign them on the dotted line." In June 2007, Katrina Kaif and Deepika Padukone were finalised to play two of the leading ladies, but the former's role was later removed from the script due to the film's story becoming too long. Actress Amrita Rao was also considered to play one of the leading ladies, but opted out.

The heroines share very limited time on screen together, and therefore most of their parts were filmed separately. Basu's portions were filmed in Mumbai, India and Capri, Italy. Padukone's portions were filmed in Sydney, while the song "Khuda Jaane" was shot at multiple locations in Italy, including Venice, Alberobello, Santa Cesarea Terme, Mattinata, Apulia, Naples, and Capri. Lamba's portions, inspired by Aditya Chopra's Dilwale Dulhania Le Jayenge (1995), were filmed in the similar locales of Amritsar and Switzerland. 

Kapoor's look in the film was styled by Aki Narula, which changed with time. In the title track, Kapoor had at least 10 wardrobe changes in a single shot. Though he found styling for 3 lead actresses' characters exciting and challenging, as all play different types who enter into Kapoor's life at different times, so he ensured that the styling was unique without any overlapping.

Since two of the film's characters work for Microsoft Game Studios, plenty of video games released by them are referenced. In addition, nearly all of the films referenced are releases from Yash Raj Films, with the notable exception of Hum Kisise Kum Naheen (1977).

Release 
Continuing the tradition of showcasing the first look of their upcoming films with their latest release, Yash Raj Films showcased the first teaser-trailer of the film on 25 April 2008 with the release of Vijay Krishna Acharya's Tashan and the official trailer of the film was released on 27 June 2008 with the release of Kunal Kohli's Thoda Pyaar Thoda Magic.

Yash Raj Films usually does not spend much money on promotion. However, it made an exception with Bachna Ae Haseeno. Instead of the usual promotion 2–3 weeks before a film release, the production house planned a new strategy with promotional activities taking place over a span of 2 months.

Soundtrack

There are seven tracks in the film including a remix version. The album entered the Top 3 of the music charts within a couple of days of its arrival on the stands. The lyrics of all the songs are written by Anvita Dutt Guptan, while the title track features lyrics by Majrooh Sultanpuri along with Guptan. According to the Indian trade website Box Office India, with around  units sold, this film's soundtrack album was the year's sixth highest-selling, with the songs "Khuda Jaane" and "Bachna Ae Haseeno" being popular among the masses.

Awards and nominations

References

External links
 
 
 Bachna Ae Haseeno on Indiafm.com

2008 films
2000s Hindi-language films
Yash Raj Films films
Films shot in Australia
Films directed by Siddharth Anand
Films scored by Vishal–Shekhar
Films shot in Switzerland
Films shot in Mumbai
Films set in Mumbai
Indian romantic comedy films
2008 romantic comedy films
Films about atonement